The Indonesia women's national under-17 football team is a national association football youth team of Indonesia and is controlled by the Football Association of Indonesia.

Indonesia has qualified for the AFC U-17 Women's Asian Cup only twice in its history, with their first appearance being in 2005 and the second appearance being in 2024 as hosts.

Results and fixtures

International Matches in last 12 months, and future scheduled matches

2023

Competitive record

FIFA U-17 Women's World Cup

AFC U-17 Women's Asian Cup

References

External links
 The Official Indonesian Football Association website
 Indonesia on FIFA

Asian women's national under-17 association football teams
Women's football in Indonesia
W